Jean-Baptiste Sanson de Pongerville (3 March 1782, Abbeville – 22 January 1870, Paris) was a French a man of letters and poet.  He was elected the tenth occupant of Académie française seat 31 in 1830.

External links
 

1782 births
1870 deaths
People from Abbeville
18th-century French writers
18th-century French male writers
19th-century French writers
English–French translators
French poets
Members of the Académie Française
French male poets
19th-century French male writers
French male non-fiction writers
19th-century French translators